South African Americans are Americans who have full or partial ancestry from South Africa. As of 2012, there were approximately 80,000 people born in South Africa who were living in the United States (according to the OECD). As of 2019, there were approximately 85,000 people born in South Africa who were living in the United States.

Demography 
The majority of overseas South Africans live in the United Kingdom, Australia and New Zealand, countries with similar cultural and linguistic heritage to many South Africans, as well as similar climates and latitude positioning. There were also a large number of South African immigrants that went to the US. Many White South Africans, both before and after the end of apartheid, emigrated to Midwestern states such as Minnesota and Illinois. Atlanta, Georgia, has a large population of South African Jews. Also, a number of South Africans live in New York City and Mid-Atlantic states such as Maryland. Most South African immigrants in the US are White people of European origin. Of the 82,000 South Africans that were living in this country between 2008 and 2009, about 11,000 of them were Black South Africans. In the 2000 Census, 509 South African Americans reported their ethnic origins as Zulu.

The majority of these immigrants are English speaking, with a moderate proportion of these being South African Jews. In the US, South Africans in general—both white and black—live in the US individually, rather than in communities of South African Americans. One area with many South Africans in the US is San Diego, California, while smaller populations reside elsewhere in the Western United States, including the Pacific Northwest.

South African-born population
South African-born population in the US since 2010:

Organizations 
Indaba ("discussion" in Zulu) is an example of an organization set up by South Africans to promote community involvement. It was founded in the 1990s and sponsors community events and activities. In addition, this organization allows the exchange of information through a web site and a mailing list, keeping South Africans informed about international and local events. The South African consulate in Chicago has close ties with many expatriates and hosts regular events and speakers, including an annual celebration of Freedom Day on 27 April. In 2001, the hosts founded the African Group of the U.S. Women's Action to boost the knowledge and understanding of South Africa among Americans. The South Africans are also in many other forums, such as informal parties, religious activities and rugby matches.

Notable people

 Adam Friedland, comedian
 Adam Rose, professional wrestler
 Andrew Parkinson, soccer player
 Andrew Pattison, tennis player
 Angela Hawken, academic
 Arnold Vosloo, actor
 Ben Viljoen, Boer general, politician and author
 Candice Pillay, singer, songwriter
 Caron Bernstein, model and actress
 Charlize Theron, model and actress
 Cliff Drysdale, tennis player
 Colin Cowie, lifestyle guru
 Da L.E.S, hip hop artist and record producer
 Daniel Mindel, cinematographer
 Dave Matthews, musician
 Dave Wittenberg, anime and video game voice actor
 David DeCastro, American football player
 David O. Sacks, entrepreneur
 Denise Scott Brown, architect and urban planner
 Doja Cat, singer and rapper
 Earl Sweatshirt, rapper
 Elizabeth Furse, US politician
 Elon Musk, entrepreneur
 Embeth Davidtz, actress
 Gary Barber, producer
 Goapele, rhythm & blues artist
 Gregory Alan Isakov, singer-songwriter
 Jason Lewis, state politician
 Johan Kriek, tennis player
 Jonathan Butler, musician, guitarist
 Jonathan Westphal, philosopher
 Jordan Taylor, professional racing driver
 Julian Krinsky, American, former South African, professional tennis player
 Justin Gabriel, professional wrestler
 Katrina Pierson, CNN and Fox News Contributor
 Kongos brothers, musicians
 Liezel Huber, tennis player
 Lyndon Rive, businessman, cousin of Elon Musk
 Madelaine Petsch, actress
 Mark Mathabane, author
 Mike Connell, professional footballer
 Nana Meriwether, Miss USA 2012
 Patrick Soon-Shiong, entrepreneur
 Richard W. Fisher, politician and banker
 Ricky Taylor, professional racing driver
 Robert Hamerton-Kelly, theologian
 Robert Schneider, musician and producer
 Robert Z. Lawrence, economist
 Rodney Howard Browne, theologian and author
 Roy Wegerle, soccer player
 Sasha Pieterse, actress
 Selema Masekela, sports broadcaster, son of Hugh Masekela
 Stelio Savante, actor
 Stephen Simpson, professional racing driver
 Styles P, rapper
 Tammin Sursok, actor, singer, composer and guitarist
 Trevor Denman, thoroughbred race caller
 Trevor Noah, comedian and television host
 Trevor Rabin, musician
 Tshego, musician
 Victor Nogueira, soccer goalkeeper
 Zinzi Clemmons, writer

See also

 South Africa–United States relations
 Southern Africans in the United States

References

External links
 EveryCulture — South African-Americans

 
 
Southern Africans in the United States